The canton of Rosans is a former administrative division in southeastern France. It was disbanded following the French canton reorganisation which came into effect in March 2015. It consisted of 7 communes, which joined the canton of Serres in 2015. It had 1,134 inhabitants (2012).

The canton comprised the following communes:

Bruis
Chanousse
Montjay
Moydans
Ribeyret
Rosans
Saint-André-de-Rosans
Sainte-Marie
Sorbiers

Demographics

See also
Cantons of the Hautes-Alpes department

References

Former cantons of Hautes-Alpes
2015 disestablishments in France
States and territories disestablished in 2015